Phantom Rock  is a tourist destination in Ambalavayal in the district of  Wayanad  in Kerala. It is a natural metamorphic rock formation resembling a human skull, and thus is known as Phantom Rock.  

This structure is situated 17 km from Kalpetta and can be reached by trekking. It stands at a height of 2600 feet above sea level. It is near "Cheengeri Mala". Edakkal Caves is also nearby.

videos

For wayanad vibes search #t4ubysiril

Phantom Rock Wayanad Top tourist place in wayanad ഫാന്റം റോക്ക്

Threats 
Unscientific and unregulated granite mining is posing a serious threat to the fragile natural rock structure.

Gallery

References 

Geography of Wayanad district
History of Kerala
Archaeological sites in Kerala